Richard Charles Neitzel Holzapfel (born 1954) is a former professor of Church History and Doctrine at Brigham Young University (BYU) and an author on topics related to the Church of Jesus Christ of Latter-day Saints (LDS Church), Western and Utah History, and the New Testament. As of 2018, Holzapfel is working in the LDS Church's Missionary Department as a senior manager.

Biography
Holzapfel was born in Blackfoot, Idaho, and moved regularly as a child, due to his father's naval career. In addition to his native state, his family resided in California, Hawaii, and  Maine. He attended Castle Park High School (Chula Vista, California) and graduated from York High School (York, Maine) in 1972. Holzapfel served from 1973 to 1975 as a missionary for the LDS Church in Italy and Switzerland.

Holzapfel attended BYU, Hebrew Union College, and the University of California, Irvine (UC Irvine), receiving B.A., M.A., and Ph.D. degrees respectively, with an emphases in Middle Eastern Studies, Jewish History, Ancient History, American History, and Nineteenth Century American Religious History.

Holzapfel met Jeni Carol Broberg at BYU, and they were married in 1978. A year later their first child, Nate, was born and the family also moved to California to pursue graduates studies, with Holzapfel completing a doctorate at UC Irvine.  While at UC Irvine, he simultaneously worked for the LDS Church's seminary and institute program.  His first book, Old Mormon Nauvoo 1839-1846 was released in 1990 and received the citation for Significant Contribution from the John Whitmer Historic Association. He is the author of the state history textbook used in Utah public schools, Utah: A Journey of Discovery.

Holzapfel taught at BYU from 1993 until 2018 when he began working for the LDS Church's Missionary Department overseeing the development of worldwide missionary curriculum. In this position, he was involved in creating the updated missionary handbook in 2019.

Holzapfel and his wife reside in Springville, Utah and are the parents of five children.

In 2007, Holzapfel assisted the More Good Foundation in launching Christ.org, a website intending to bring people closer to Jesus Christ.

In October 2021, Holzapfel's oldest son, Nate Holzapfel, was arrested on allegations that he defrauded a woman he had been dating out of nearly $200,000.

Academia and scholarship 

Holzapfel earned his Ph.D. in history from UC Irvine in 1993. Following his graduation in 1993, Holzapfel went to BYU as an assistant professor, teaching in the Church History and Doctrine, Ancient Scripture, Honors, and History departments. His courses included World Civilization, Utah History, American Heritage, Doctrine and Covenants, New Testament, and Foundations of the Restoration. He taught at the BYU Jerusalem Center from 1997 to 1998 and directed the BYU Study Abroad program in Italy and Greece in 2009. Holzapfel has lectured around the United States and around the world including in Brazil, Canada, Cyprus, England, Germany, Italy, Jordan, Lebanon, and Syria.

Holzapfel served as the Publications Director of the Religious Studies Center at BYU from 2006 to 2010, and as editor of the Religious Educator, a quarterly publication from 2000 to 2010.

Throughout his academic career, Holzapfel received several awards including:

 Special Citation, Mormon History Association
 Dwight L. Smith Award, Western History Association
 Numerous awards from the Charles Redd Center for Western History
 Alcuin Fellowship in General Education
 Honors Professor of the Year
 Karl G. Maeser General Education Professorship

In addition to teaching and filling various committee assignments at BYU, Holzapfel continued a research, writing, and publication agenda. He has been published in several national and regional journals including the Utah Historical Quarterly, The History Teacher, Western Historical Quarterly, Christian Century, Journal of Mormon History, Encyclopedia of Latter-day Saint History, and Utah History Encyclopedia.

Works
Holzapfel has written over 45 books, including biographies and various photographic works. Following is a partial list.

He Will Give You Rest: An Invitation and a Promise (with Gaye Strathearn)
Sisters at the Well: Women and the Life and Teachings of Jesus (co-authored with his wife, Jeni Broberg Holzapfel)
Women of Nauvoo (co-authored with his wife, Jeni Broberg Holzapfel)
Jehovah and the World of the Old Testament (co-author)
Jesus Christ and the World of the New Testament (co-author)
What Da Vinci Didn't know: An LDS Perspective (co-author)
Within These Prison Walls: Lorenzo Snow's Record Book, 1886-1897 (co-edited with Andrew H. Hedges)
Joseph Smith's Prophetic Ministry: A Year-by-Year Look at His Life and Teachings (co-author)

Holzapfel also edited, along with Thomas A. Wayment, a three-volume series The Life and Teachings of Jesus Christ.

He has also published several book reviews and over 100 articles or book chapters on a wide variety of subjects including LDS Church leadership and succession, the Dead Sea Scrolls, the Life of Christ, New and Old Testament culture and history, Jewish religious practices, and women's perspectives on religion both ancient and modern.

LDS Church Service 
Holzapfel has served in the LDS Church as a bishop, ward Young Men president, high councilor, bishop's counselor, stake mission president, and member of the Gospel Doctrine class manual writing committee.

He served as president of the Alabama Birmingham Mission from 2010 to 2013, and as president of the church's Provo Utah YSA 1st Stake from 2014 to 2018. In 2018, Holzapfel was called as an area seventy.

Notes

Sources
Provo Herald, March 8, 2008
Course listing including a short bio of Holzapfel
World Cat Publication listing Richard Neitzel Holzapfel

External links
 Holzapfel's blog hosted by the BYU Religious Studies Center.
 BYU Religious Education faculty website
 
 Interview with Holzapfel on the Doug Wright Show on KSL radio.
 Holzapfel's vita

1954 births
20th-century Mormon missionaries
American historians of religion
American male non-fiction writers
American Latter Day Saint writers
Brigham Young University alumni
Brigham Young University faculty
Church Educational System instructors
Hebrew Union College – Jewish Institute of Religion alumni
Historians of the Latter Day Saint movement
Living people
American Mormon missionaries in Italy
American Mormon missionaries in Switzerland
Mission presidents (LDS Church)
People from Blackfoot, Idaho
Writers from Provo, Utah
University of California, Irvine alumni
People from Chula Vista, California
American leaders of the Church of Jesus Christ of Latter-day Saints
American Mormon missionaries in the United States
Historians from California